KPRT-FM (107.9 MHz) is a radio station licensed to Kirtland, New Mexico, United States. The station serves the Four Corners area and is currently owned by Winton Road Broadcasting Co., LLC.

KPRT-FM signed on in January 2012 and airs a variety hits music format branded as "Pirate Radio".

References

External links

PRT-FM
Adult hits radio stations in the United States
Radio stations established in 2012